Raymond Louviot (17 December 1908 – 14 May 1969) was a French professional road bicycle racer. He was the grandfather of cyclist Philippe Louviot.

He became a team manager after retirement. The British cyclist, Brian Robinson, accuses a commercial tie-up between Louviot and Miguel Poblet a rival in another team, for denying him first place in the 1957 Milan–San Remo. Robinson said:

My manager, Raymond Louviot, had a tie-up in the cycle trade with Poblet. He told me that if Poblet was anywhere near me it was my job to get him over the line first. I buggered off up a hill, then my manager came up and told me 'Remember what I told you.' Poblet won, I was third, that is my biggest regret. If I had won I would have been made for life.

Major results

1933
Tour du Midi
Grand Prix des Nations
1934
 national road race championship
Tour de France:
Winner stage 22
1936
Paris - Sedan
1937
Circuit des Deux-Sèvres
Paris - Soissons
Tour du Sud-Ouest
1938
Paris - Rennes
1939
Tour de France:
Winner stage 4
1940
Critérium de France
1941
GP de l'Auto
Paris - Nantes
1947
GP Ouest-France

References

External links 

Official Tour de France results for Raymond Louviot

French male cyclists
1908 births
1969 deaths
French Tour de France stage winners
People from the canton of Fribourg